The Vijayanagara metropolitan area comprised the urban core of the imperial city and the surrounding principalities of the capital of the Vijayanagara empire in the time period spanning early 14th. century to the middle of 16th. century C.E.

Abdur Razzak, the Persian traveller who visited Vijayanagara in 1440 C.E. wrote of six fortifications before reaching the gates of the royal palace. The areas between the first and second and between the second and third fortification was large and contained agricultural fields, gardens and many residences. From the notes of Robert Sewell it becomes clear that between the third fortification up to the actual fortress, one came across countless people, shops, bazaars. From their accounts the area of the greater metropolitan area of Vijayanagara was about 540 km² which is about 25 times larger than the area comprising the main administrative, sacred and royal centers. The tourist zone itself is limited to the inner urban core.

Over the years, archaeological surveys have helped document over 700 sites spanning a time frame from 3rd. century BCE to early 2nd. millennium, including ash mounds, settlements, megalithic cemeteries, temples and sites of rock art. It is clear that the Vijayanagara area was well settled for a period long before the formation of the empire. Surveys conducted by the Vijayanagar Metropolitan Survey has estimated that the real size of the metropolitan city may have been some 650 km² of which a 120 km² area immediately surrounding the core area called the Intensive Survey Area has been the focus of study.

Vijayanagara is located in present-day Karnataka, about a hundred miles southwest of Hyderabad.

Forts and roads

The Vijayanagara empire created its cities with the main intention of protection against invasion. The capital itself was a fortress and designed as such in every manner with massive stone and earthen walls, hilltop fortresses and watch towers scattered across the length and breadth. Visitors to the city, irrespective of their guild and intention had to travel through a heavily fortified and protected environs before reaching the main urban core, giving the visitor an ample view of the might that protected the empire. Massive fortifications were made in every possible entry into the main metropolitan area and in other crucial locations. Other defensive features were watch posts, bastions located along roads, gates and hilltops that allowed for maximum visibility.

The capital was a center of commerce, pilgrimage and the most important political nerve center of the empire. Envoys from other kingdoms, merchants, pilgrims, soldiers and ordinary people all travelled about in the great city through an extensive network of roads. Research has sown some 80 transport related sites and several broad roads about 30–60 meters wide that were the major transport routes into the city core. Smaller roads, less than 10 meters wide, lead to temples, settlements and irrigation fields. All major roadways could be monitored from watch towers, gates and rest houses.

Urban settlements
The greater metropolitan region of the city was inhabited by royalty, imperial officers, soldiers, agriculturists, craftsman, merchants, labourers and others. Settlements outside the metropolitan areas were discontinuous where people lived in walled towns and villages. These settlements may have been inhabited by a few thousand and others were large enough to hold ten to fifteen thousand residents.  Each settlement had multiple shrines and temples. Numerous Vijayanagara period relics have been lost due to the inhabitation of these settlements by modern-day settlers. Literary sources from this era testify to the presence of large military encampments on the city's outskirts.

Agriculture and craft
While today the environs of the metropolitan city appear to be barren, evidence of extensive deforestation and numerous agricultural sites have been recorded. Virtually all available arable land was used for irrigation using variety of innovative methods. In fact a significant percentage of the population was involved in agriculture, making the city self-sufficient in food. This enabled the capital city to withstand long sieges, many of which did happen during the three century long existence of the empire. These discoveries indicate dramatic landscape changes. Numerous canals dug out provided perennial water supply to a narrow strip of fertile land bordering the Tungabhadra river. Many of these canals are still in use though modified in most cases to meet current requirements. Many of the tanks created for water storage purposes like the Kamalapura tank still are in use. Survey of the Intensive Survey Area has shown the presence of 60 water reservoir embankments. Numerous other agricultural features like check dams, erosion control walls and wells have been recorded. The net result of these schemes was a complex agricultural landscape that was characterized by a multitude of agricultural regimes appropriate to complex topography, resources, needs and populations.

Sanduru, which forms the southern boundary of the greater metropolitan region was and still is well known for iron and hematite ores. Iron slag and other metallurgical debris have been documented at more than thirty sites. Of these five sites have been dated to the Vijayanagara period containing iron smelting workshops.

Sacred sites

The greater metropolitan area, apart from being a bustling commercial and military encampment also had some 140 sacred sites, making it a very important place of religion and religious pilgrimage. Apart from temples, numerous sacred images and structures in residential and defensive sites have been recorded. Sacred sites include large temples with towering gopuras, such as the Mallikarjuna temple in Mallappanagudi, a town on the main road connecting modern Hosapete and Vijayanagara built in the period of Deva Raya I. Smaller temples and shrines are also plenty.  Even more numerous are the images of deities carved onto boulder and slab surfaces and hero stones (virgal) which were also considered sacred. Sculpted icons of Hanuman, Bhairava, Virabhadra and goddesses in various forms are also common. Images from folk traditions like naga stones (snake stones) are also seen and are linked with woman's ritual activities.
Tombs associated with the Muslim inhabitants of the city are also present.

References
 Carla M. Sinopoli and Kathleen D. Morrison, New Light on Hampi, Recent research in Vijayanagara, edited by John M. Fritz and George Michell, MARG, 2001,

External links
 Economic Diversity and Integration in a Pre-Colonial Indian Empire

Vijayanagara Empire
Vijayanagara district